Giovanni Ottavio Bufalini  (17 January 1709, in Città di Castello – 3 August 1782)  was an Italian cardinal.

Giovanni Ottavio was not ordained a priest until the age of 45 years in 1754. He was rapidly named  Archbishop of Chalcedon, apostolic nuncio to Switzerland, and elevated to Cardinal within 12 years (21 July 1766). He was also appointed Bishop of Ancona and Numana.

References

External links
 Catholic Hierarchy, entry for Bufalini. 

1709 births
1782 deaths
Apostolic Nuncios to Switzerland
18th-century Italian cardinals
18th-century Italian Roman Catholic archbishops